Albert Bachmann (born 8 November 1906, date of death unknown) was a Swiss gymnast who competed in the 1936 Summer Olympics.

References

1906 births
Year of death missing
Swiss male artistic gymnasts
Olympic gymnasts of Switzerland
Gymnasts at the 1936 Summer Olympics
Olympic silver medalists for Switzerland
Olympic bronze medalists for Switzerland
Olympic medalists in gymnastics
Medalists at the 1936 Summer Olympics